Sheikh Ahmad-e Jami mausoleum complex (in Persian: مجموعهٔ آرامگاهی شیخ احمد جامی) is a collection of religious buildings, mosques, houses and tombstones all around the central tombstone of Sheikh Ahmad-e Jami, Iranian Muslim sufi who lived between 1048 and 1141 in Torbat-e Jam, Khorasan, Iran. The shrine and its Sufi shaykhs secured patronage from Mongols, Kartids, Tamerlane, and Timurids. 

Entering to the mausoleum is through a wooden door beautifully decorated in Kufic script. The mausoleum complex is over 800 years old.

The mausoleum has been in the favor of the city. Pilgrims and mystics still practicing ʿirfan ('gnosticism') and travellers visit the city, which is a source of income for the population.

The shrine complex has now been renovated with private and public funds from Iran's Cultural Heritage Organization. As a shrine for a Sunni Sufi cult, the shrine-complex started sliding into decline when Iran's Shahs took the Shiʿi path in 1501, but is today enjoying a renaissance. Two seminaries (madrasa) that teach Sunni curricula to males and females have also been added.

References

Torbat-e Jam County
Mausoleums in Iran
Buildings and structures in Razavi Khorasan Province
Tourist attractions in Razavi Khorasan Province